Tautobriga is a genus of moths in the family Erebidae. The genus was erected by Francis Walker in 1869.

Species
Tautobriga erythropus (Felder & Rogenhofer, 1874) Colombia
Tautobriga euspila Walker, 1869 Honduras
Tautobriga glaucopis Hampson, 1926 Peru

References

Calpinae